All or Nothin' (stylized as All or N.O.thin) is an album by American rap group 54th Platoon. It was released on May 6, 2003 as the only studio album released through the short-lived FUBU Records. Production was handled by eight record producers, including Lil Jon, Ty Fyffe, Megahertz and N.O. Joe. It features guest appearances from 8Ball, Jason Peele, Jazze Pha and Nicole Wray.

Spawning two promotional singles, "Holdin It Down" and "She Like", the album peaked at No. 128 on the Billboard 200 and No. 21 on the Top R&B/Hip-Hop Albums chart in the United States.

Track listing

Charts

References

External links

2002 debut albums
Hip hop albums by American artists
Albums produced by Lil Jon
Albums produced by N.O. Joe
Albums produced by Ty Fyffe